Rhyme is a form of poetry or speech.

Rhyme or Rhymes may also refer to:
HTC Rhyme, a mobile phone
Paulie Rhyme, American rapper
Rhyme (linguistics)
"The Rhyme" (song), a hip hop song from the Keith Murray album Enigma
Rhymes (surname)
"Rhymes", a song by The Goons With The Wormwood Scrubs Screws Orchestra

See also
Ryme Intrinseca, a village in Dorset, England